Shadworth Hollway Hodgson, FBA (1832 – 13 June 1912) was an English philosopher.

Biography
He worked independently, without academic affiliation.  He was acknowledged by William James as a forerunner of Pragmatism, although he viewed his work as a completion of Kant's project.  Hodgson was a member of a London philosophy club with James, called the "Scratch Eight". Hodgson regarded the poets William Wordsworth and Samuel Taylor Coleridge as his chief inspirations, and had no academic background, though he was a member of the Metaphysical Society.

He was the first president of the Aristotelian Society and held that post from 1880 to 1894.

His principal work was The Metaphysic of Experience (1898) which prepared the way for New Realism. He objected to the stance of empiricism in its postulating of persons and things, and insisted that neither subject nor object are warranted as initial considerations of philosophy.

He died on 13 June 1912.

Attention to Hodgson was briefly enlivened by an article by Wolfe Mays in a British phenomenology journal in the 1970s.

The volumes of Hodgson's principal work were often shipped with uncut pages and visits to libraries with these volumes has revealed that sometimes most pages of all 4 volumes remained uncut even one hundred years later.

Notes

External links
Internet Encyclopedia of Philosophy article on Hodgson
Philosophy of Reflection at openlibrary.org
The metaphysic of experience University of Wisconsin - Madison scan
Wm James on Hodgson

Metaphysicians
English philosophers
1832 births
1912 deaths
Presidents of the Aristotelian Society
Burials at Kensal Green Cemetery
Fellows of the British Academy